Eric M. Gast (born 23 April 1968) is an American music industry professional - record producer, mixer, engineer, and recording studio designer - and founder and CEO of a nonprofit public health care charity. Gast was born in New Jersey and raised in New York City. He is cousin to  documentary filmmaker Leon Gast. as well as another cousin Eric W. Gast former athlete and model

Music business career

Gast was managed by Zomba Music Group from 1989–2000, working with artists such as A Tribe Called Quest, Billy Ocean, Kid Rock, Will Smith, Britney Spears, and Enuff Z'nuff.

Since 2000 he has been a freelance producer and engineer, expanding to broader musical styles such as jazz, gospel, and world music recordings. In these veins, Eric worked with artists such as James Moody, Jonathan Butler, Charlie Parker tribute album, John P. Kee, and Cissy Houston.

In 2003, he started FM For Music LLC, a production and management company. FM not only managed Gast, but also several other producers and engineers.

He has contracted and designed studios in Atlantic City, Florida, and Brussels.

He also has worked on numerous movie soundtracks over his career.  After working with soundtrack projects in Eastern Europe, Eric opened label/media companies in the Czech Republic, Hungary, and Romania.

Charity

Gast always wanted to give back to the communities in which he worked. As time progressed in his charity work, Eric decided to enlist the medical community and to expand his vision. He then started Legacy of Hope.

References

External links
Legacy of Hope Official Website

1968 births
Living people
People from Manhattan